Hans-Olof Nilsson (born 22 December 1956) is a Swedish former trade union leader.

Born in Eslöv, Nilsson began working at a slaughterhouse owned by the Kooperativa Förbundet in 1972.  He joined the Swedish Food Workers' Union (Livs), and in 2000 began working full-time at its head office.  The following year, he was elected as the union's vice president, then in 2005 he became its president.  In 2007, he was additionally elected as the president of the International Union of Food, Agricultural, Hotel, Restaurant, Catering, Tobacco and Allied Workers' Associations.  In 2017, he retired from his trade union positions.

References

1956 births
Living people
People from Eslöv Municipality
Swedish trade unionists